The Maiden of Finland is the national personification of Finland.

Personification 
She is a barefoot young woman in her mid-twenties with blonde hair, blue eyes, wearing a blue and white national costume or a white dress. She was originally called Aura after the Aura River in Turku.

As a symbol, the Finnish Maiden has been used since the 19th century when she was pictured as a woman wearing a turreted crown, and then developing as Finland gained a national consciousness and independence. She was depicted in poetry and fine arts. Zachris Topelius and Walter Runeberg were important in establishing the Finnish Maiden as a symbol. Like the Mother Svea of neighbouring Sweden, the Finnish maiden was, at first, a mature woman, but gradually became younger.

Mapping 

The Maiden of Finland can also refer to the shape of Finland on a map. It's imagined as a female form which has one hand raised (and another, before the Moscow Armistice of 1944), a head, and a skirt. The metaphor is so commonly used that the northwestern area around Enontekiö is known as the "arm" (Käsivarsi) even in official contexts.

References

External links 
 473 - A Map of One Arm Waving: Suomi-Neito Strange Maps bigthink.com
 Finlandia by Jean Sibelius- thisisFINLAND

National personifications
National symbols of Finland
Fictional Finnish people